Dahala may refer to:

Dahala Khagrabari, an Indian enclave belonging to the District of Cooch Behar in the State of West Bengal
Chedi Kingdom, or region, also known as Dahala-mandala
Kalachuris of Tripuri, people populating regions of Dahala
DaHeala, artistic name of Canadian record producer Jason Quenneville